Nicolai Yuryevich Reshetikhin (born October 10, 1958 in Leningrad, Soviet Union) is a mathematical physicist, currently a professor of mathematics at Tsinghua University, China and a professor of mathematical physics at the University of Amsterdam (Korteweg-de Vries Institute for Mathematics). He is also a professor emeritus at the University of California, Berkeley. His research is in the fields of low-dimensional topology, representation theory, and quantum groups. His major contributions are in the theory of quantum integrable systems, in representation theory of quantum groups
and in quantum topology.  He and Vladimir Turaev constructed invariants of 3-manifolds
which are expected to describe quantum Chern-Simons field theory introduced by Edward Witten.

He earned his bachelor's degree and master's degree from Leningrad State University in 1982, and his Ph.D. from the Steklov Mathematical Institute in 1984.

He gave a plenary lecture at the International Congress of Mathematicians in 2010. He was named a Fellow of the American Mathematical Society, in the 2022 class of fellows, "for contributions to the theory of quantum groups, integrable systems, topology, and quantum physics".

See also 
Reshetikhin–Turaev invariant

References

External links

1958 births
Living people
20th-century Russian mathematicians
21st-century Russian mathematicians
Mathematicians from Saint Petersburg
Topologists
Academic staff of the University of Amsterdam
University of California, Berkeley faculty
Fellows of the American Mathematical Society